O'Donnell is a West Texas city that lies primarily in Lynn County, with a small portion extending south into Dawson County, Texas. Its population was 831 at the 2010 census, down from 1,011 at the 2000 census. The Lynn county portion of O'Donnell is part of the Lubbock Metropolitan area.

History
O'Donnell was settled in 1910 and named for Tom J. O'Donnell, a railroad promoter. O'Donnell was a railroad-created town, founded in anticipation that the Pecos and Northern Texas Railway would lay tracks through the area.

A branch of the Pecos and Northern Texas Railway was constructed from Slaton to Lamesa in 1910. The rails were abandoned and removed in 1999. In 2016, a controversy arose when the school was reported for having the ten commandments on its wall; when forced to take it down, the students came together and wrote Bible verses on sticky notes and posted them on the wall.

Geography

O'Donnell is on the High Plains of the Llano Estacado at  (32.9637085 –101.8326542). U.S. Highway 87 passes just northwest of the city limits, leading southwest  to Lamesa and north  to Lubbock.

Demographics

2020 census

As of the 2020 United States census, there were 704 people, 353 households, and 252 families residing in the city.

2010 census
As of the 2010 United States Census, O'Donnell had 831 people, a 17.8% reduction from the 2000 US Census. The population resided in 315 households, of which 237 were identified as family households. The racial makeup of the city was 73.4% White, 1.2% African American, 0.6% Native American, 0.4% Asian, 20.3% from other races, and 4.1% from two or more races.  Hispanics or Latinos of any race were 62.8% of the population.

In the city, the age distribution was 31.2% under 18, 52.0% from 18 to 64, and 16.8% who were 65 or older. The median age was 38.5 years.

The median income for a household in the city was $26,103, and for a family was $30,833. Males had a median income of $26,193 versus $15,917 for females. The per capita income for the city was $12,924. About 24.4% of families and 24.8% of the population were below the poverty line, including 31.1% of those under age 18 and 15.0% of those age 65 or over.

Education
O'Donnell is served by the O'Donnell Independent School District and is home to the O'Donnell High School Eagles.

Gallery

Notable people

 Dan Blocker, was born in DeKalb, Texas, and moved with his parents to O'Donnell shortly after his birth. He is best known for playing Hoss Cartwright on the NBC television series Bonanza. A small museum in O'Donnell features limited Blocker memorabilia
 Phil Hardberger, a former mayor of San Antonio, grew up in O'Donnell. His parents, Homer Reeves Hardberger and the former Bess Scott, are buried in O'Donnell

See also
Llano Estacado
West Texas

References

External links
Roadside America, Dan Blocker Memorial
Handbook of Texas: O'Donnell, Texas

Populated places established in 1910
Cities in Lynn County, Texas
Cities in Dawson County, Texas
Cities in Texas
1910 establishments in Texas